James Black Groome (April 4, 1838October 5, 1893), a member of the United States Democratic Party, was the 36th Governor of Maryland in the United States from 1874 to 1876.  He was also a member of the United States Senate, representing Maryland, from 1879–1885.

Early life and career
Groome was born in Elkton, Maryland and completed preparatory studies in the Tennent School of Hartsville, Pennsylvania, with hopes of attending Princeton University. However, a severe injury during that time that left him sickly the rest of his life forced him to abandon his college aspirations. Groome instead studied law with his father—the wealthy and former gubernatorial candidate Colonel John Groome—and was admitted to the bar in 1861. Due to his ill health, Groome did not serve during the American Civil War.

In 1867, Groome was a strong voice in favor of a new constitution for the state of Maryland, and served as a representative from Cecil County, Maryland to the state constitutional convention that same year. He was elected to the Maryland House of Delegates in 1871, 1872, and 1873, and was highly regarded among his colleagues from the Maryland Eastern Shore. At one point in 1872, Groome was even considered as a candidate for the U.S. Senate by the House of Delegates.

Governor of Maryland and Senator
In 1874, the House of Delegates elected Governor William Pinkney Whyte to the U.S. Senate, leaving the governor's seat vacant. Groome was by far the most popular candidate in the special election that was held in the House of Delegates, and was elected governor at the age of 35, receiving 62 of the 70 votes cast. As governor, Groome's administration was rather unspectacular, as many of the necessary appointments had been made by his predecessor before his resignation. Groome even commented that he felt he had no other tasks besides attending banquets and awarding prizes and diplomas. Groome did make several recommendations to the legislature during his tenure, however, including the implementation of glass ballot boxes in elections to reduce fraud, and a full re-assessment of value and property of the state.

During the gubernatorial renomination process, Groome realized his chances of being re-elected were slim, mostly due to a serious argument he was involved in prior to the nomination convention. He withdrew his candidacy, and placed support with John Lee Carroll, who would win the election. Groome resumed the practice of law for a short while afterward his withdrawal, until he was elected as a Democrat to the United States Senate, serving from March 4, 1879 to March 3, 1885. He served alongside Arthur P. Gorman and his gubernatorial predecessor William Pinkney Whyte.

Later years
After serving in the Senate, Groome was appointed by President Grover Cleveland as collector of customs for the port of Baltimore, Maryland, serving from 1889–1893. He spent much of his final years in his home in Baltimore, where he died in 1893. Groome is interred in Elkton Presbyterian Cemetery of Elkton, Maryland. A Baltimore Sun editorial commented, after his death, "few men have compassed so much in so short a time and without arousing animosities." Furthermore, Groome's local paper commented that he "was everybody’s friend ... The humblest could approach him without a sense of restraint, but none were so mighty as to feel disposed to trifle with him".

References
Frank F. White, Jr., The Governors of Maryland 1777–1970 (Annapolis:  The Hall of Records Commission, 1970), 185–187.

1838 births
1893 deaths
Democratic Party governors of Maryland
Democratic Party members of the Maryland House of Delegates
People from Elkton, Maryland
Democratic Party United States senators from Maryland
19th-century American politicians